Yas-e No was a reformist newspaper in Iran, unofficially an outlet of the Islamic Iran Participation Front. The paper was in circulation between 2002 and 2009 with long interruptions.

History and profile
Yas-e No was launched in March 2002. On 19 February 2004, the Iranian judiciary banned the newspaper, perhaps temporarily, only one day before the parliamentary election, after the paper published an open letter from some members of the outgoing parliament to Ayatollah Khamenei, the Supreme Leader. The letter was read to journalists by Mohsen Armin, one of the organizers of the sit-in by MPs  criticizing the vetting of candidates by the Council of Guardians. Saeed Mortazavi, Tehran's general prosecutor, announced that he had ordered the ban because of a request by the Supreme National Security Council. Hassan Rouhani, then the council's chair, and Mohammad Khatami, the then president, denied this assertion on 20 and 23 February, respectively, saying that the matter was not even discussed at the council's meeting.

After five-year ban the paper was allowed to publish in May 2009. However, following the presidential election the paper was again banned on 11 June 2009.

See also
List of newspapers in Iran

References

2002 establishments in Iran
2009 disestablishments in Iran
Banned newspapers
Censorship in Iran
Defunct newspapers published in Iran
Newspapers established in 2002
Persian-language newspapers
Publications disestablished in 2009
Newspapers published in Tehran